The Mitsui Outlet Park Taichung Port is an outlet store in Wuqi District, Taichung, Taiwan.

History
The idea to construct the outlet was brought up in September 2016. On 21 August 2017, the groundbreaking ceremony was held which was attended by Taichung Mayor Lin Chia-lung and Chairperson of Taiwan International Ports Corporation. The outlet was opened on 12 December 2018 after 16 months of construction.

The second phase of the expansion project was opened on the 16th of December 2021. A total of 51 stores have been added, including Abercrombie & Fitch, which was exhibiting in Taiwan for the first time, and its subsidiaries Abercrombie kids, Hollister Co® and GILLY HICKS.

Architecture
The outlet was designed by TMA Architects and Associates and constructed by Reiju Construction Co., Ltd. It was designed with a total of two stories and spans over a total floor area of 6 hectares on an 18-hectare site area It features a giant ferris wheel.

Business
The outlet is owned and operated by Mitsui & Co. Taiwan Ltd. It has a mix of 170 shops and restaurants.

On 7 June 2019, Taiwan's first 20 degrees Celsius ski resort "SNOWTOWN" was opened with the introduction of Japanese technology.

See also
 List of tourist attractions in Taiwan
 Mitsui Outlet Park Linkou

References

External links

 

2018 establishments in Taiwan
Outlet malls in Taiwan
Shopping malls in Taichung
Shopping malls established in 2018
Mitsui Fudosan